Gogikona  is a village in the southern state of Karnataka, India. It is located in the Shahapur taluka of Yadgir district in Karnataka. Gogikona is a companion village to Gogipeth which lies less than half a kilometre to the northwest, across a small stream, and together the two are often known as "Gogi".

Demographics
 India census, Gogikona had a population of 7,046 with 3,552 males and 3,494 females.

See also
 Yadgir

References

External links
 

Villages in Yadgir district